The Kansas City Open Invitational, which played as the Kansas City Open for most of its history, was a golf tournament on the PGA Tour that was played in the greater Kansas City area in the late 1940s and 1950s. A total of four clubs hosted the event. The first event was held at Kansas City's Swope Park Golf Course, now known as Swope Memorial Golf Course,  and is the only public course in the Kansas City area ever to have hosted a PGA Tour event. The Milburn Country Club in Overland Park, Kansas, a par-72, 18-hole championship course built in 1917, hosted the event five times. Kansas City's Hillcrest Country Club, a par-72, 18-hole course built in 1916, hosted the event three times. Two events were held at Blue Hills Country Club, which is also in Kansas City and was built in 1912.

Tournament hosts

Winners

References

Former PGA Tour events
Golf in Kansas
Golf in Missouri
Sports in the Kansas City metropolitan area
Recurring sporting events established in 1949
Recurring sporting events disestablished in 1959
1949 establishments in Missouri
1959 disestablishments in Missouri